James Alan Robinson (born 1960) is a British economist and political scientist. He is currently the Reverend Dr. Richard L. Pearson Professor of Global Conflict Studies and University Professor at the Harris School of Public Policy, University of Chicago. He also serves as the Institute Director of The Pearson Institute for the Study and Resolution of Global Conflicts at the Harris School. Robinson has previously taught at Harvard University between 2004 and 2015 and also at the University of California, Berkeley, University of Southern California and the University of Melbourne.

He studies what makes countries different by focusing on the underlying economic and political institutions that lead some to prosperity and others to conflict. With Daron Acemoglu, he is the co-author of books, such as The Narrow Corridor, Why Nations Fail and Economic Origins of Dictatorship and Democracy.

Life
Robinson studied economics at the London School of Economics (BSc), the University of Warwick (MA) and Yale University (PhD). His main research interests are in comparative economic and political development with a focus on the long-run with a particular interest in Latin America and Sub-Saharan Africa.

In 2004, he was appointed Associate Professor of Government at Harvard. He later held named chair positions at Harvard, first as the David Florence Professor of Government (2009-2014) and later as the Wilbur A. Cowett Professor of Government (2014-2015). On July 1, 2015, he was appointed as one of nine University Professor at the Harris School of Public Policy Studies of the University of Chicago. He also holds the title Reverend Dr. Richard L. Pearson Professor of Global Conflict Studies. On 9 May 2016, professor Robinson was awarded honorary doctor's degree by the National University of Mongolia during his first visit to the country.

He has conducted research in countries around the world including Botswana, Chile, the Democratic Republic of the Congo, Haiti, the Philippines, Sierra Leone, South Africa and Colombia where he teaches every summer at the University of the Andes in Bogotá.

He has collaborated extensively with long-time co-author Daron Acemoglu after meeting at the London School of Economics.

Academic research

Economic Origins of Dictatorship and Democracy
Economic Origins of Dictatorship and Democracy (2006), co-authored by Robinson with Daron Acemoglu analyzes the creation and consolidation of democratic societies. They argue that "democracy consolidates when elites do not have strong incentive to overthrow it. These processes depend on (1) the strength of civil society, (2) the structure of political institutions, (3) the nature of political and economic crises, (4) the level of economic inequality, (5) the structure of the economy, and (6) the form and extent of globalization."

Why Nations Fail
In Why Nations Fail: The Origins of Power, Prosperity, and Poverty (2012), Acemoglu and Robinson argue that economic growth at the forefront of technology requires political stability, which the Mayan civilization (to name only one) did not have, and creative destruction.  The latter cannot occur without institutional restraints on the granting of monopoly and oligopoly rights.  They say that the industrial revolution began in Great Britain, because the English Bill of Rights 1689 created such restraints.  For example, a steam boat built in 1705 by Denis Papin was demolished by a boatmen guild in Münden, Germany.  Papin went to London, where several of his papers were published by the Royal Society.  Thomas Newcomen extended Papin's work into a steam engines in 1712, and became a commercial success, while Papin died in 1713 and was buried in an unmarked pauper's grave.

Acemoglu and Robinson insist that "development differences across countries are exclusively due to differences in political and economic institutions, and reject other theories that attribute some of the differences to culture, weather, geography or lack of knowledge about the best policies and practices."  For example, "Soviet Russia generated rapid growth as it caught up rapidly with some of the advanced technologies in the world [but] was running out of steam by the 1970s" because of a lack of creative destruction.

The Narrow Corridor
In The Narrow Corridor. States, Societies, and the Fate of Liberty (2019), Acemoglu and Robinson argue that a free society is attained when the power of the state and of society evolved in rough balance.

A critique of modernization theory
Daron Acemoglu and James A. Robinson, in their article "Income and Democracy" (2008) show that even though there is a strong cross-country correlation between income and democracy, once one controls for country fixed effects and removes the association between income per capita and various measures of democracy, there is "no causal effect of income on democracy." In "Non-Modernization" (2022), they further argue that modernization theory cannot account for various paths of political development "because it posits a link between economics and politics that is not conditional on institutions and culture and that presumes a definite endpoint—for example, an 'end of history'."

Publications

Books

Articles
 Acemoglu, Daron, Simon Johnson, and James Robinson. 2001. “The Colonial Origins of Comparative Development: An Empirical Investigation.” American Economic Review Vol. 91, Nº 5: 1369–401.
 Robinson, James A. 2006. “Economic Development and Democracy.” Annual Reviews of Political Science 9, 503-527.
 Acemoglu, Daron, Simon Johnson, James A. Robinson, and Pierre Yared. 2008. "Income and Democracy." American Economic Review 98(3): 808-42.
 Acemoglu, Daron, Simon Johnson, James A. Robinson, and Pierre Yared. 2009	“Reevaluating the Modernization Hypothesis.” Journal of Monetary Economics 56(8): 1043-58.
 Acemoglu, Daron and James Robinson. 2022. "Non-Modernization: Power–Culture Trajectories and the Dynamics of Political Institutions." Annual Review of Political Science 25(1): 323-339

See also

References

External links
 

1960 births
Living people
Yale University alumni
Alumni of the University of Warwick
Alumni of the London School of Economics
British development economists
British political scientists
American political scientists
Academic staff of the University of Melbourne
University of Southern California faculty
University of California, Berkeley College of Letters and Science faculty
Harvard University faculty
University of Chicago faculty
Fellows of the American Academy of Arts and Sciences
20th-century American economists
21st-century American economists
Fellows of the Econometric Society